Carolina Coach Garage and Shop is a historic intercity bus garage located at Raleigh, North Carolina.  It was built in 1926, and is a one-story, rectangular building measuring approximately 90 feet by 140 feet.  It features a stepped parapet with five levels with original terra cotta coping caps that hides a truss supported gabled roof.  The building housed the Carolina Coach Company maintenance facilities until 1939.

It was listed on the National Register of Historic Places in 2009.

References 

Commercial buildings on the National Register of Historic Places in North Carolina
Commercial buildings completed in 1926
Buildings and structures in Raleigh, North Carolina
National Register of Historic Places in Raleigh, North Carolina
1926 establishments in North Carolina